The Poplar River is a river in northeastern Kenora District in northwestern Ontario, Canada. It is in the James Bay drainage basin and is a left tributary of the Atikameg River.

The Poplar River begins at an unnamed lake and flows northeast, then east to its mouth at the Atikameg River. The Atikameg River flows via the Kapiskau River to James Bay.

References

Sources

Rivers of Kenora District